Dino Innocenti (6 December 1913 – 1 December 1971) was an Italian ice hockey player. He competed in the men's tournament at the 1948 Winter Olympics.

References

1913 births
1971 deaths
Olympic ice hockey players of Italy
Ice hockey players at the 1948 Winter Olympics
People from Graubünden